The women's 100 metres event at the 1983 Summer Universiade was held at the Commonwealth Stadium in Edmonton, Canada on 5 and 6 July 1983.

Medalists

Results

Heats
Held on 5 July

Wind:Heat 1: +0.3 m/s, Heat 2: -0.6 m/s, Heat 3: ? m/s, Heat 4: -0.5 m/s

Semifinals
Held on 6 July

Wind:Heat 1: 0.0 m/s, Heat 2: 0.0 m/s

Final
Held on 6 July

Wind: +2.2 m/s

References

Athletics at the 1983 Summer Universiade
1983